The 1975 All-Ireland Senior Club Camogie Championship for the leading clubs in the women's team field sport of camogie was won by Croagh-Kilfinny from Limerick, who defeated Athenry from Galway in the final, played at Athenry .

Arrangements
The championship was organised on the traditional provincial system used in Gaelic Games since the 1880s, with Newry Shamrocks and Buffers Alley winning the championships of the other two provinces. Buffers Alley had 11 wides in their semi-final against Athenry.

The Final
Bríd Stokes scored three goals as Croagh-Kilfinny came from behind in extra time to win an exciting final by one point.

The Programme
Later the match programme became one of the most sought after collectors’ items in the code of camogie. Pádraig Puirséil wrote in the Irish Press: In one respect camogie and Athenry were winners by a distance. At Thurles for the club hurling final, we had a single sheet four page programme which gave us the teams, the referee, the starting time and that, let’s face it, is the type of program that has filled the bill satisfactorily at such games to date colleague Peadar O'Brien tells me there was no programme at the club football final in Portlaoise. In complete contrast the distaff side of my family brought back from Athenry a 20-page, well-orinbted programme that included, as well as the names of the players, brief histories of the clubs concerned and of the Camogie Association, plus pictures of the two teams. The programme was entirely produced by the Athenry camogie club, with obvious support from local traders and, in this respect, the camogie club final was so much ahead of its hurling and football counterparts that there was simply on comparison.

Final stages

References

External links
 Camogie Association

1975 in camogie
1975